The Net is a 1995 American action thriller film directed by Irwin Winkler and starring Sandra Bullock, Jeremy Northam, and Dennis Miller. The film was released on July 28, 1995.

Plot
United States Under Secretary of Defense Michael Bergstrom commits suicide after being informed that he has tested positive for HIV.

Angela Bennett is a systems analyst and remote worker in Venice, California for Cathedral Software in San Francisco. Her interpersonal relationships are almost completely online and on the phone, with the exception of forgettable interactions with her neighbors and visits to her mother, who is institutionalized with Alzheimer's disease and often forgets who Bennett is. 

Bennett's co-worker, Dale, sends her a floppy disk of the game "Mozart's Ghost" with a backdoor labeled "π" that permits access to a commonly used computer security system called "Gatekeeper" sold by Gregg Microsystems, a software company led by CEO Jeff Gregg. 

Dale and Bennett agree to meet, but the navigation system in Dale's private aircraft malfunctions and it crashes into a tower, killing him.

Bennett travels to Cozumel on vacation, where she meets Jack Devlin. After seducing Bennett, Devlin pays a mugger to steal her purse as they walk along the beach. He chases the mugger into the foliage, catches the mugger, and roots through the purse to find the disk before shooting the mugger. 

He takes Bennett out on his speedboat to kill her as well, but she finds his gun and confronts him. While fleeing with the disk and Devlin's wallet, Bennett's dinghy collides with rocks. She is unconscious in the hospital for three days.

When Bennett wakes up, she finds that the disk was ruined by the sun and all records of her life have been deleted: She was checked out of her hotel room in Cancun, her car is no longer at the airport parking lot, and her credit cards are invalid. Bennett's home is now empty and listed for sale. 

Moreover, because none of the neighbors remember her, they cannot confirm her identity. Bennett's Social Security number is now assigned to a "Ruth Marx", for whom Devlin has entered an arrest record by using the Gatekeeper backdoor to hack the police computer system. 

When Bennett calls her own desk at Cathedral Software, an imposter answers and offers Bennett her old life back in exchange for the disk. She contacts the only other person who knows her by sight, psychiatrist and former lover Alan Champion. He checks her into a hotel, offers to contact a friend at the FBI, and arranges to have her mother moved for her safety.

Using her knowledge of the backdoor and a password found in Devlin's wallet, Bennett logs into the Bethesda Naval Hospital's computers and learns that Under Secretary of Defense Bergstrom, who had opposed Gatekeeper's use by the federal government, was murdered by altering the results of his HIV test leading to a misdiagnosis. Fellow hacker "Cyberbob" connects π with the "Praetorians", a notorious group of cyberterrorists linked to recent computer failures around the country. Bennett and Cyberbob plan to meet, but the Praetorians intercept their online chat. Bennett escapes from Devlin—a contract killer for the cyberterrorists, but the Praetorians kill Champion by tampering with pharmacy and hospital computer records. After Bennett is arrested by the California Highway Patrol, a man identifying himself as Champion's FBI friend frees her from jail. She realizes he is an imposter and escapes again.

Now wanted for murder and thought to be Ruth Marx, Bennett hitchhikes to Cathedral's office where, using her imposter's computer, she connects the cyberterrorists to Gregg Microsystems and uncovers their scheme: once the Praetorians sabotage an organization's computer system, Gregg sells Gatekeeper to it and gains unlimited access through the backdoor. Bennett emails evidence of the backdoor and Gregg's involvement with the Praetorians to the FBI from the Moscone Center and tricks Devlin into releasing a virus into Gregg's mainframe, destroying Gatekeeper and undoing the erasure of her identity. During a battle on the catwalks of the convention center, in which Devlin accidentally kills the Bennett imposter from Cathedral Software (the real Ruth Marx), Bennett ambushes Devlin with a fire extinguisher, causing him to fall to his death. Bennett regains her identity, home, and life. She then reunites with her mother, and the conspiracy is exposed, with Jeff Gregg being arrested by the FBI, live on television.

Cast

Production
In October 1994, Bullock committed to filming The Net from mid-January through April 10, 1995. The Net was filmed in San Francisco's Moscone Center and Macworld on January 5, 1995, as well as at Washington, D.C., locations in April 1995.

Reception

Box office
Including foreign markets, the film grossed $110.6 million worldwide.

Critical response
Based on 55 reviews, it has an average score of 5.4 out of 10 on Rotten Tomatoes with 44% of critics giving positive reviews. The site's consensus states: "The premise isn't without potential and Sandra Bullock is as likable as ever, but The Net lacks sufficient thrills – or plausible plot points – to recommend catching." Metacritic, using a weighted average, assigned the film a score of 51 out of 100 based on 22 reviews, indicating "mixed or average reviews". Roger Ebert gave the film three out of four stars, describing The Net as basically an update of an Alfred Hitchcock trope ("Innocent Person Wrongly Accused"), which was in parts contrived but carried by Bullock's naturalistic performance. 
Owen Gleiberman, writing for Entertainment Weekly, complimented Sandra Bullock's performance, saying, "Bullock pulls you into the movie. Her overripe smile and clear, imploring eyes are sometimes evocative of Julia Roberts". Audiences polled by CinemaScore gave the film an average grade of "B" on an A+ to F scale.

Sequel and spin-off TV series
A sequel named The Net 2.0, starring Nikki DeLoach as Hope Cassidy and directed by Charles Winkler, son of Irwin Winkler, was announced in February 2005. It was released direct-to-video in 2006, and was about a young systems analyst who arrives in Istanbul for her new job, to find that her identity has been stolen.

The film spawned an American spinoff television series of the same name, starring Brooke Langton as Angela Bennett.

See also
 List of films featuring surveillance

References

External links

1995 films
1995 action thriller films
1990s chase films
1990s mystery thriller films
American action thriller films
American chase films
American mystery thriller films
Columbia Pictures films
Films about identity theft
Films about miscarriage of justice
Films about murderers
Films about technological impact
Films about the Internet
Films adapted into television shows
Films directed by Irwin Winkler
Films produced by Irwin Winkler
Films scored by Mark Isham
Films set in Los Angeles
Films set in Mexico
Films set in San Francisco
Films set in the San Francisco Bay Area
Films set in Washington, D.C.
Films shot in San Francisco
Films shot in Washington, D.C.
HIV/AIDS in American films
Malware in fiction
Techno-thriller films
Films about computer hacking
1990s English-language films
1990s American films